Douai Abbey is a Benedictine Abbey at Upper Woolhampton, near Thatcham, in the English county of Berkshire, situated within the Roman Catholic Diocese of Portsmouth. Monks from the monastery of St. Edmund's, in Douai, France, came to Woolhampton in 1903 when the community left France as a result of anti-clerical legislation. The abbey church is listed Grade II* on the National Heritage List for England.

History
The community of St. Edmund was formed in Paris in 1615 by Dom Gabriel Gifford, later Archbishop of Rheims and primate of France. With his backing the community flourished. Expelled from Paris during the Revolution, the community took over the vacant buildings of the community of St Gregory's in Douai in 1818.

Amid the political upheavals caused by the Dreyfus affair around the turn of the 19th century, the French prime minister Waldeck-Rousseau introduced an anti-clerical Law of Associations (1901) that "severely curbed the influence of religious orders in France". This led to the community being given the minor seminary of St. Mary in Woolhampton by Bishop Cahill of Portsmouth, moving from Douai to Woolhampton in 1903. The abbey church was opened in 1933 but only completed in 1993 due to financial constraints.

The monastery was greatly expanded in the 1960s with the building of the new monastery designed by Sir Frederick Gibberd. The abbey had in its charge Douai School until the latter's closure in 1999. In 2005, two monks returned to Douai, France to form a community there and restore the historic links to English monasticism.

Jacobitism
The monastery and its community have traditionally maintained strong links to the Stuart dynasty and the Jacobite cause; with King James II of England buried in the monastery in Saint-Germain-en-Laye, near Paris (the community's home from the early 17th century till the French Revolution and the community's relocation to Douai in northern France), members of the House of Wittelsbach (present pretenders to the Jacobite claim) being educated at the community's former boarding school (at their present location), and the immediate past abbot, Geoffrey Scott OSB, is a member of the Jacobite Society.

Present
In July 2014 a monk was ordained priest, the first priestly ordination since 2007. As of 2020, the community consisted of 23 monks. The monks serve in parishes across five dioceses. The patron of the monastery is St Edmund King and Martyr, whose feast day is 20 November.

Music
The Abbey Church houses two pipe organs, a smaller organ of 1978 in an Italian style by Tamburini and a larger organ of 1994 in a modernised English Classical style by Kenneth Tickell.

Because it contains these organs, and especially because of its unique and reverberant acoustics, the Abbey Church is frequently used as a recording location by musical performers.  Commercial albums recorded there include:

 Carlo Gesualdo - Tenebrae by The Hilliard Ensemble (March 1990).
 Pierre de la Rue - Missa Cum Iocunditate, Motets by The Hilliard Ensemble (1997).
 The Old Hall Manuscript by The Hilliard Ensemble (1990).
 Cristobal de Morales - Mass For The Feast Of St. Isidore Of Seville by the Gabrieli Consort & Players, directed by Paul McCreesh (2003).
 A New Venetian Coronation 1595 by the Gabrieli Consort & Players, directed by Paul McCreesh (2012).
 Handel Organ Concertos by Baroque Belles and David Willcocks (1999).
 MacMillan And His British Contemporaries by the choir of New College, Oxford (2006).
 Rutter: Requiem by the choir of Clare College, Cambridge (2003).

List of Abbots

 1900–1904: Lawrence Larkin 
 1904–1905: Ambrose Bamford 
 1905–1913: Stanislaus Taylor 
 1913–1921: David Hurley 
 1921–1929: Edmund Kelly 
 1929–1969: Sylvester Mooney 
 1969–1989: Gregory Freeman 
 1989–1990: Leonard Vickers
 1990–1998: Finbar Kealy
 1998–2022: Geoffrey Scott

Gallery

See also
Douai, France
Douai School
English College, Douai
English Benedictine Congregation

References

External links

Douai Parish Website
Photographs of the Abbey

Christian organizations established in 1903
Benedictine monasteries in England
Grade II* listed churches in Berkshire
History of Berkshire
Grade II* listed Roman Catholic churches in England
Monasteries in Berkshire
Monasteries of the English Benedictine Congregation
Organisations based in Berkshire
Roman Catholic churches completed in 1933
Roman Catholic churches in Berkshire
1903 establishments in England
20th-century Christian monasteries
20th-century Roman Catholic church buildings in the United Kingdom
Woolhampton